Ahmed Hussain Meshqi (Arabic:أحمد حسين مشقي) is a football player, a left back for Al-Diriyah , in Saudi Arabia.

References

Living people
Saudi Arabian footballers
1993 births
Al-Orobah FC players
Khaleej FC players
Al-Shoulla FC players
Al-Jabalain FC players
Al-Nahda Club (Saudi Arabia) players
Al-Kholood Club players
Al-Diriyah Club players
Saudi First Division League players
Saudi Professional League players
Saudi Second Division players
Association football fullbacks